Canal Lake is a lake of Ontario, Canada, situated in the City of Kawartha Lakes. Canal Lake is a medium size lake with a large diversity of fishing spots.

Canal Lake is the most north-western of the Kawartha Lakes, located between Kirkfield on the east and Bolsover to the west.  It is the first lake east of Lake Simcoe, connected by the Talbot River which also connects the lake to Mitchell and Balsam Lakes to the east.  It is located between Lock #37 Bolsover and Lock #36 Kirkfield Lift Lock of the Trent–Severn Waterway.

Water levels are controlled. The levels are raised up again in the Spring.

Nearby towns include Beaverton, Fenelon Falls, Lindsay, and Bobcaygeon.

Historic sites and monuments

The "Hole in the Wall" bridge was built in 1905 and is also known as the Canal Lake Concrete Arch Bridge.  It was designed by the federal Department of Railways and Canals. It is located on Centennial Park Road on the southwest side of the Trent Severn Waterway bridge, northeast of Bolsover. The bridge was designated a National Historic Site of Canada in 1988.

Fishing

There is a variety of fish available including largemouth bass, pike and muskellunge (muskie) and an abundance of panfish.

See also
List of lakes in Ontario

References

Lakes of Kawartha Lakes
Trent–Severn Waterway